W. G. Grace visited Australia in 1873–74 as captain of "W.G. Grace's XI".  On the morning of the team's departure from Southampton, he responded to well-wishers by saying that his team "had a duty to perform to maintain the honour of English cricket, and to uphold the high character of English cricketers".  But both his and the team's performance fell well short of this goal.  The tour was not a success and the only positive outcome was the fact of the tour having taken place, ten years after the previous one, as it "gave Australian cricket a much needed fillip".  Most of the problems lay with Grace himself and his "overbearing personality" which quickly exhausted all personal goodwill towards him.  There was also bad feeling within the team itself because Grace, who normally got on well with professional players, enforced the class divide throughout the tour.  In terms of results, the team fared reasonably well following a poor start in which they were beaten by both Victoria and New South Wales.  They played 15 matches in all but none are recognised as first-class.

References

External links
 CricketArchive – W.G. Grace

Bibliography

 
 
 
 
 
 
 

Australian cricket seasons from 1850–51 to 1889–90
1873